Christopher Potter (1591–1646) was English academic and clergyman

Christopher Potter or Chris Potter may also refer to:

Christopher Potter (died 1817), MP for Colchester 1781–2 and 1784
Christopher Potter (author) (born 1959), former publisher and managing director of Fourth Estate
Chris Potter (actor) (born 1960), Canadian actor, musician and pitchman
Chris Potter (jazz saxophonist) (born 1971), American jazz saxophonist, composer, and multi-instrumentalist
Chris Potter (record producer), British music producer and mixer
Chris Potter (priest) (born 1969), Dean of St Asaph
Chris Potter, fictional character on sitcom Kenan and Kel played by Dan Frischman